Moataz Mahrous (born November 15, 1984) is an Egyptian professional footballer who plays as a central midfielder for the Egyptian club Alassiouty Sport. In May 2017, Mahrous suffered from a cruciate ligament injury during their match against Sohag, he was the top goal scorer in Group A in 2016–17 Egyptian Second Division then.

References

External links
Moataz Mahrous at KOOORA.com

1984 births
Living people
Egyptian footballers
Association football midfielders
Telephonat Beni Suef SC players
El Gouna FC players
Ghazl El Mahalla SC players
Pyramids FC players
Beni Suef SC players